Media Alliance is an American media resource and advocacy center for media workers, non-profit organizations, and social justice activists. Through policy work and grassroots organizing, Media Alliance aims to ensure the unfettered flow of information by keeping media accessible, accountable, diverse and free from government control and corporate dominance.  Media Alliance is a 501(c)(3) public charity, NTEE Code: A30—Media, Communications Organizations.

Media Alliance was founded in 1976 by a group of media workers to unite the professional media community with the public interest communities of the Bay Area.

Issues 

 Holding Big Media Accountable to Community Needs

Works to ensure that local radio, TV and newspaper outlets are meeting the needs of diverse communities. Tactics include conducting media monitoring, convening town hall forums and meetings with media representatives, and when appropriate, organizing for changes at outlets that are not fulfilling their public interest obligations.

 Opening The Internet For Everyone – digital inclusion and the digital divide

Mega-corporations exacerbate the digital divide with discriminatory redlining practices. MA works to bridge the digital divide and make sure the Internet stays open for us all by intervening in regulatory forums at the local state and regional level, calling for corporate accountability and helping local communities organize for a better deal from the companies, including choice, price, and reliability.

 Defending Press Freedom and Media Workers' Rights

Initially founded as a legal defense committee for journalists under fire, MA supports media workers in organizing for better working conditions, freedom from government harassment, and increased resources for rigorous, investigative, community-based reporting with a particular emphasis on community media. 

Digital Surveillance

Tracking, spying and profiling are turning the liberatory power of electronic communications into a nightmare for activists, whistleblowers and other vulnerable communities. MA is leading on local responses to bulk surveillance, police militarization, predictive algorithms, social media monitoring and crackdowns on free expression, the right to dissent and biometrics. 

Social Media Accountability

Through FUU-People Power and other projects, Media Alliance calls for increased accountability from social media platforms to users and viewers to reduce harm. 

Training and Media Capacity Building

Media Alliance offers workshops for groups of five or more. MA provides capacity building training to under-represented groups to reframe media myths and deliver authentic first-voice expression on social justice issues.

Fiscal Sponsorship

Media Alliance supports community-based arts and media projects with fiscal sponsorship services.

People 
Executive Director: Tracy Rosenberg  2007–current
2002–2007 Jeff Perlstein
1997–2002 Andrea Buffa
1995–1997 Erika Wudtke
1993-1995 Ann Wrixon
1988-1993 Micha Peled
1986-1988 Fred Stout
1984-1985 Karen Wickre
1981-1984 Daniel Ben-Horin
1977-1980 Ken McEldowney

Contact
Pacific Felt Factory   2830 20th Street, Suite 201  San Francisco CA 94110

See also 
 Prometheus Radio Project v. FCC
 Media democracy
 Citizen media
 Prometheus Radio Project
 Pacifica Radio Network

Communications and media organizations based in the United States
Non-profit organizations based in California
501(c)(3) organizations
Fiscal sponsorship organizations